The Temes class was a class of originally Austro-Hungarian river monitor warships used during World War I. A notable member was Bodrog (later the ).

Description
They were armed with two L/35 guns in single gun turrets, a single L/10 howitzer in a central pivot mount, and two  guns.

Ships

History

Notes

References

Bibliography

 

Monitor classes
World War I naval ships of Austria-Hungary
World War I monitors